Tom Andrews (born June 15, 1954) is an American retired hurdler.  Running for the University of Southern California, he was the 1977 NCAA Champion in the 400 meters hurdles.

While at West Bakersfield High School, he finished second in the 400 meters at the 1973 CIF California State Meet.

References

1954 births
Living people
American male hurdlers
Track and field athletes from California
Universiade medalists in athletics (track and field)
Sportspeople from Bakersfield, California
Universiade gold medalists for the United States